Brigadier D. A. Asare was a Ghanaian military personnel and a former Chief of Army Staff of the Ghana Army. He served as Chief of Army Staff from Feb 1972 to Jan 1973.

References

Ghanaian military personnel
Chiefs of Army Staff (Ghana)